The Central African Republic is one of the world's poorest countries and the film industry is correspondingly small. The first film made in CAR appears to have been Les enfants de la danse, a short French-made ethnographic documentary of 1945. Joseph Akouissone was the first Central African to make a film in the country, with his 1981 documentary Un homme est un homme; he was followed by the documentaries made in the 1980s by Léonie Yangba Zowe.  Since then a series of ongoing conflicts and economic crises have severely limited the potential growth of film-making in the country. The first feature-length drama made in the country was Le silence de la forêt, a 2003 CAR-Gabon-Cameroon co-production about the Biaka people.

List of Central African films

This is a sortable list of films produced in the CAR.

Films made 
A Pygmy in the Bathtub, 

short film, 1993. Broadcast: Canal Plus, TV5, CFI Festival: Montreal, Fespaco, Amiens…

La Couture de Paris, 

short film, 1995. Distribution: CFI, Canal + Horizon, TV5, Festivals: Fespaco, Amiens, Montréal, Namur.

Au Bout du couloir, 

short film, 1999. Festivals: Montreal, Amiens.

Diogenes to Brazzaville, 

Documentary film, 2004. Portrait of the Congolese writer Sony Labou Tansi. Broadcast: TV 10, CFI, Canal + Horizon, TV5, Festivals: Vue d'Afrique Montreal, Amiens, Fespaco, Namur, Milan, Lisbon.

Tchicaya, the little leaf that sings its country, 

Documentary film, 2004. Portrait of the Congolese writer Tchicaya U'Tamsi. Diffusion: Images Plus, CFI, Canal + Horizon, Festivals: Fespaco, Amiens.

Films 

 Yangba bolo, 1985
 Lengue, 1985
 N'Zale, 1986
 Paroles de sages, 1987

Filmography 

 Le silence de la forêt [The Silence of the Forest], 2003

Central African Republic film directors 
*Didier Ouénangaré

*Léandre-Alain Baker

Léonie Yangba Zowe
 Mamadou Mahmoud N'Dongo
 Joseph Akouissone
 Maurice Alezra
 Béatrice Boffety
 Patrick Demeester
 Georges Durupt
 Micheline Durupt
 Richard
 Bernard Guenau
 Gérard Guérin
 Evane Hanska
 Charles Lescaut
 harles Leaut
 Chantal Monstile
 Denis Parrichon
 Moussa Ndongo
 Sylviane Gboulou Mbapondo
 Leila Thiam
 Monsieur Habib  
 Fiacre Bindala
 Camille Lepage
 Andre kolingbe 
 bocha Sango 
 mokonga Quenitin
 Alex Ballu
 Heritter Acteur
 Djimon Hounsou
 Mbéni Yé by Sparrow
 Étienne Goyémidé
 droite Eric Sabe, 
 Ida Mabaya, 
 lesultan de dekoa
 Hippolyte Donossio
 Ousna Ousnabee
 DRAMAN'S PRODUCTION
 NGAISSIO Abdoul Karim
 ASSANAS TEKATA Simon Patrick
 LAMINE Odilon Alias Cheguevara
 Andy melo
 kailou Sylla
 Nicna Meunrisse
 Boris Lojkine
 Didier Flort Ouén
 Leger Serge kokpakpa 
 Jm wolf Gang 
 lzy Orphelin
 Brown Goh
 Eric Yelemou
 Lassa Kossangue 
 Bande Originale
 Hurel BenInga

See also

Culture of the Central African Republic
List of African films

References

 
Central African Republic
Central African Republic-related lists